AROB or AroB may refer to:
 Autonomous Region of Bougainville, an autonomous region of Papua New Guinea
 3-dehydroquinate synthase, an enzyme